Nagindas Sanghavi (10 March 1920 – 12 July 2020) was an Indian political professor, author and columnist writing in English, Hindi and Gujarati. He received Padma Shri, India's fourth highest civilian honour in 2019.

Biography 

He was popularly known as "Naginbapa" (Bapa=Grand Father). He was born in Bhavnagar and obtained his education there. After completing his education he started his career as typist in an advertising company on monthly salary of Rupees 30. After couple of other jobs he turned to education. Sanghavi started his teaching career (1951–80) at Bhavan's College, Andheri. He later moved to Ruparel College, Mahim and Mithibai College, Vile Parle teaching political science and History. While teaching at college he had started writing in Newspaper. Post retirement he used to get pension of Rupees 700 which was not sufficient for living and he continued to write.

Selected works 
Sanghavi has written overall 29 books in Gujarati and English. He used to write political column in Gujarati Magazine Chitralekha.

 Gujarat: A Political Analysis; (1996) Centre for Social Studies
 Gandhi: The Agony of Arrival - The South Africa Years; (2006) Rupa Publications India
 Gujarat At Cross-Roads; (2010) Bharatiya Vidya Bhavan 
 A Brief History of Yoga; (2012) Kinnard Publishing, 
 Mahamanav Shrikrushna; (2012) R.R. Seth & Sons 
 Narendra Modi; (2017) Navbharat
 Geeta Vimarsh; (2017) Diamond Books 
 Sardar Patel - Ek Samarpit Jivan; (2017) Navajivan Trust

Awards
In 2019, Sanghavi had received India's fourth highest civilian honor, Padma Shri in 2019 for his contributions in the field of literature. He has also received Vaju Kotak Gold Medal.

See also
 List of Gujarati-language writers

References

External links
 

2020 deaths
Recipients of the Padma Shri in literature & education
1920 births
Gujarati-language writers
Indian columnists
Indian political writers

Indian centenarians
Men centenarians